Dodoitsu (都々逸) is a form of Japanese poetry developed towards the end of the Edo period. Often concerning love or work, and usually comical, Dodoitsu poems consist of four lines with the moraic structure 7-7-7-5 and no rhyme for a total of 26 morae, making it one of the longer Japanese forms. The form, tone and structure of Dodoitsu derive from Japanese folk song traditions.

In popular media
Dodoitsu poetry is referenced in the manga and anime series Shōwa Genroku Rakugo Shinjū in reference to its historical recitation by dancers in Japanese red-light districts.

References

Poetic forms
Japanese poetry